Sichów Mały  is a village in the administrative district of Gmina Rytwiany, Staszów County, Świętokrzyskie Voivodeship, Poland.

The village has a population of  396.

Demography 
According to the 2002 Poland census, there were 390 people residing in Sichów Mały village, of whom 50.5% were male and 49.5% were female. In the village, the population was spread out, with 19.5% under the age of 18, 31.3% from 18 to 44, 23.3% from 45 to 64, and 25.9% who were 65 years of age or older.
 Figure 1. Population pyramid of village in 2002 — by age group and sex

References

Villages in Staszów County